Tragic Figures is the debut studio album by American post-punk band Savage Republic, released in 1982 by Independent Project. The reissue version was augmented with the 1982 single "Film Noir" and the 1984 EP Tragic Figure, among other bonus tracks.

The sleeve design, by Bruce Licher, features a photograph of the revolutionary government executing Iranian Kurds on August 24, 1979. The photographer, Jahangir Razmi, won a Pulitzer Prize anonymously but was able to reveal himself in 2006.

Track listing

Personnel
Adapted from the Tragic Figures liner notes.

Savage Republic
Philip Drucker (as Jackson Del Rey) – guitar, percussion, vocals
Mark Erskine – drums, vocals
Bruce Licher – vocals, guitar, bass guitar, percussion
Jeff Long – bass guitar, guitar, percussion, vocals

Production and additional personnel
John Golden – mastering
Ethan James – engineering

Release history

In other media

The song Real Men is used in the Silence of the Lambs (film) when Catherine Martin captures Jame Gumb's pet dog and threatens to kill it before Clarice Starling arrives.

References

External links 
 

1982 debut albums
Savage Republic albums